Shanthi Sekaran is an Indian American educator and novelist known for such books as The Prayer Room and Lucky Boy.

Career
Sekaran is an adjunct professor at the California College of Arts and St. Mary's College of California, where she teaches creative writing.

Published in 2017, Lucky Boy was named a Best Book of 2017 by NPR, Barnes and Noble, Library Journal and The San Francisco Chronicle. It was long-listed for the Aspen Literary Prize, The Northern California Book Award, and The Morning News Rooster, and is currently shortlisted for the 2018 Chattaqua Prize.

Lucky Boy was initially optioned by Eva Longoria, David Schulner and Ben Spector for television development. The rights to Lucky Boy are up for option again.

Sekaran has written about her experiences as the child of immigrants growing up in California. She explores, through fictional approaches, the disparities in how different categories of immigrants are treated in the US. She also writes about motherhood, politics.

Education

Master of Arts, South Asian Studies, UC Berkeley 2001.

Master of Arts, Creative Writing Fiction Johns Hopkins University 2003.

Doctor of Philosophy University of Newcastle (UK) 2011, two part doctoral thesis including; Salt of Another Earth: A Critical Study of Food and Culinary Practice in Indian-American Narratives of the Immigrant Experience.

Awards and honors
Shanthi Sekaran's novel Lucky Boy became a finalist of William Saroyan International Prize for Writing in 2018.

References

External links 

Living people
American novelists of Indian descent
American women novelists
American women writers of Indian descent
21st-century American educators
21st-century American novelists
21st-century American women writers
Place of birth missing (living people)
1977 births
21st-century American women educators